Vroman may refer to:

People
Akiva Vroman, Israeli geologist
Ariel Vromen, film director 
Brett Vroman, American professional basketball player
Jackson Vroman, American-Lebanese professional basketball player
Kiany Vroman, Dutch footballer
Leo Vroman (1915–2014), Dutch-American hematologist and poet
Lisa Vroman, American lyric soprano and stage actress
Peter Vroman, American Revolutionary War soldier

Places
Vroman, Colorado, a community in the United States
Vroman, Nebraska, a community in the United States
Vroman's Nose, a prominent geological feature in Schoharie County, New York

Other
Vroman's Bookstore, an independent bookstore in Southern California
Vroman effect, named after Leo Vroman

See also
Frohman
Froman
Viromandui
Vrooman (disambiguation)